Blossomfield is a suburb of Solihull, West Midlands, England. It is the location of the main campus of Solihull College as well as Alderbrook School, Tudor Grange Academy and St Peter's Catholic School

References 

Suburbs in the United Kingdom